Dos EPs is a compilation album by the rock band Nebula. It was released in 2002 on Meteor City, and later reissued in 2018 by the band's current label, Heavy Psych Sounds Records. The album contains songs from the Nebula/Lowrider and Sun Creature EPs, as well as three new tracks.

Track listing 
All tracks by Nebula

"Rocket" – 3:42
"Long Day" – 3:32
"Bardo Airways" – 2:37
Previously Unreleased
"Anything From You" – 3:56
"Rollin' My Way to Freedom" – 5:12
"Fall of Icarus" – 4:11
"Smokin' Woman" – 5:28
"Fly On" – 6:54
"Full Throttle" – 4:08
"Sun Creature" – 3:34
"Back to the Dawn" – 4:17
Tracks 4, 6, 9 and 11 are from Nebula/Lowrider Split EP. 5, 7, 8 and 10 are from Sun Creature EP.
Tracks 5, 7-8, and 10-11 were remixed for this release.

Personnel
Eddie Glass – guitar, vocals, fender rhodes
Ruben Romano – drums, vocals
Mark Abshire – bass, layout design

Credits
Nebula – liner notes, mixing
Jack Endino – engineer
Joe Hogan – engineer
Lance Hammond – photography
Alex Oblease – photography
Arik Roper – artwork

References

External links
Nebula's website NEBULA - Albums & Audio

2002 compilation albums
Nebula (band) EPs compilation albums
MeteorCity albums